The ureteric bud, also known as the metanephric diverticulum, is a protrusion from the mesonephric duct during the development of the urinary and reproductive organs. It later develops into a conduit for urine drainage from the kidneys, which, in contrast, originate from the metanephric blastema.

References

Embryology of urogenital system